German submarine U-48 was a Type VIIB U-boat of Nazi Germany's Kriegsmarine during World War II, and the most successful that was commissioned. During her two years of active service, U-48 sank 51 ships for a total of 299,477 GRT and 1,060 tons; she also damaged four more for a total of 27,877 GRT over twelve war patrols conducted during the opening stages of the Battle of the Atlantic.

U-48 was built at the Germaniawerft in Kiel as yard number 583 during 1938 and 1939, being completed a few months before the outbreak of war in September 1939 and given to Kapitänleutnant (Kptlt.) Herbert Schultze. When war was declared, she was already in position in the North Atlantic, and received the news via radio, allowing her to operate immediately against Allied shipping.

Design
German Type VIIB submarines were preceded by the shorter Type VIIA submarines. U-48 had a displacement of  when at the surface and  while submerged. She had two shafts and two  propellers.

U-48 was fitted with five  torpedo tubes (four fitted at the bow and one at the stern), fourteen torpedoes, one  SK C/35 naval gun, 220 rounds, and one  C/30 anti-aircraft gun. The boat had a complement of between forty-four and sixty.

Service history
U-48 was a member of two wolfpacks. Seven former members of the boat's crew earned the Knight's Cross of the Iron Cross during their military career: these were the commanders Herbert Schultze, Hans-Rudolf Rösing and Heinrich Bleichrodt, the first watch officer Reinhard Suhren, the second watch Otto Ites, the chief engineer Erich Zürn and the coxswain Horst Hofmann.

U-48 survived most of the war and was scuttled by her own crew on 3 May 1945 off Neustadt in order to keep the submarine out of the hands of the advancing allies.

First patrol (19 August – 17 September 1939)
U-48 left her home port of Kiel on 19 August 1939, before World War II began, for a period of 30 days. The submarine travelled north of the British Isles, into the North Atlantic and eventually into the Bay of Biscay. She then proceeded to cruise to the west of the Western Approaches, two days after Britain and France declared war on Germany. It was here that she spotted her first target, the 4,853 GRT SS Royal Sceptre. U-48 attacked the merchant ship with her deck gun on 5 September 1939. All of the crew took to the lifeboats except the Radio Officer who remained transmitting "SOS". He was taken prisoner by U-48, but then released to the lifeboats as Schultze praised his courage. He verified that the lifeboats were provisioned with food and water. U-48 then stopped the SS Browning. The crew abandoned their vessel, but Schultze told them to return to their ship and pick up the crew of Royal Sceptre. However Browning was en route to Brazil, so it was not immediately realised that they had survived. Winston Churchill, then First Lord of The Admiralty, assumed the worst, that the crew and sixty passengers were lost. He declared the sinking to be U-48 stopped, searched and released several neutral ships before encountering and sinking Winkleigh on 8 September 1939 after her crew had taken to the lifeboats.

On 11 September U-48 sank Firby. Some of the crew required medical attention following the sinking. U-48 provisioned the lifeboats, gave medical assistance and radioed: 
Churchill, wrongly, told the House of Commons that the U-boat captain who had sent the message had been captured. After 30 days at sea, U-48 returned to Kiel on 17 September 1939. During her first war patrol, she sank three ships for a total of 14,777 GRT.

Second patrol (4–25 October 1939)
U-48s second patrol was even more successful. Having left Kiel on 4 October, she proceeded to follow the same course as her previous voyage. During her second patrol, U-48 sank a total of five enemy ships, including the large French tanker SS Emile Miguet on 12 October, Heronspool and Louisiane on 13 October, Sneaton on 14 October and Clan Chisholm on 17 October. Following the sinking of Clan Chisholm, U-48 attacked the British steamer Rockpool with fire from her deck gun on 19 October at 1:32 pm. However, the steamer returned fire. In order to avoid being hit, U-48 crash-dived. She subsequently re-surfaced and attempted to sink the steamer again when an Allied destroyer came upon the engagement. U-48 then broke off the fight with Rockpool and submerged once more to leave the area. Following the sinking of five enemy merchant ships for a total of 37,153 GRT as well as the engagement with Rockpool, U-48 returned to the safety of Kiel on 25 October 1939 after spending 22 days at sea.

Third patrol (20 November – 20 December 1939)
U-48 left Kiel for her third patrol on 20 November 1939. During this voyage, she sank a total of four vessels including two merchant ships from neutral nations. The first ship to fall victim to the U-boat was the 6,336 GRT neutral Swedish motor tanker . The wreck was later sunk by an escort vessel. One person died, 33 of her crew survived. The tug HMS St. Mellons attempted to salvage her, however Gustaf E. Reuter eventually had to be sent to the bottom by HMS Kingston Beryl on 28 November. Following the sinking of Gustaf E. Reuter, U-48 sank the British freighter Brandon on 8 December off the southern coast of Ireland. The next day, she attacked the British tanker San Alberto. Finally on 15 December 1939 U-48 stopped the neutral Greek freighter Germaine which had been chartered by Ireland and was also neutral, to carry maize to Cork. Schultze maintained that she was going to England, so he sank her. U-48 returned to Kiel on 20 December 1939 after sinking a total of 25,618 GRT and spent a total of 31 days at sea.

Fourth patrol (24 January – 26 February 1940)
After a break over the Christmas period, the boat put to sea again, sinking the British Blue Star Line liner SS Sultan Star in the Western Approaches. The vessel was only carrying freight. She laid a string of mines off St Abb's Head which failed to have any effect, but two neutral Dutch ships were added to her tally shortly afterwards, as well as a Finnish ship, all of them operating in the North Atlantic in cooperation with the Allied convoy system.

Fifth and sixth patrols (April 1940 and June 1940)
Her fifth patrol, in June 1940 was one of her most successful, making full use of the situation in Europe following the Fall of France. U-48 was commanded by Hans Rudolf Rösing, as Herbert Schultze was hospitalised with a kidney and stomach complaint. She attacked three ships off the Donegal coast; Stancor carrying fish from Iceland, Eros carrying 200 tons of small arms from America and Frances Massey with iron ore. 34 sailors lost their lives on Frances Massey. The cargo on Eros was particularly important following the losses at Dunkirk. Eros was beached on Errarooey strand. While she was being repaired, Irish troops guarded the site.

U-48 was ordered to Cape Finisterre where a U-boat 'wolfpack' was being assembled to intercept the convoy. However, the U-boats attacked other ships in the vicinity, alerting the convoy to their presence, so they altered direction, avoiding the 'wolfpack'. On 19 June 1940, Convoy HG-34 was attacked. Convoy HX 49 dispersed; U-48 sank Moordrecht, which had been in that convoy; 25 died. Ireland had chartered neutral Greek ships; U-48 sank Violando N. Goulandris (six died) while U-28 sank Adamandios Georgandis (one death). Ireland sought an explanation from Germany "... steamships, the entire cargoes of which comprised grain for exclusive consumption in Éire were sunk by unidentified submarines ..."

U-48 was enjoying an extended patrol, thanks to the newly established refuelling facilities available at Trondheim in Norway. In all, she claimed eight ships from the convoys in the Eastern Atlantic on this cruise and bagged five more on her sixth patrol in August, which finished with her stationed at Lorient on the French Atlantic coast, greatly extending her raiding abilities.

Seventh and eighth patrols (August 1940 and September 1940)

The U-boat's seventh patrol was also successful, sinking five ships, including two from Convoy HX 65, and damaging a fifth (also from HX 65) which had to be scuttled. The operating zone for both this patrol and the next was far to the north of her previous areas, being south of Greenland.

In September, on her eighth patrol she shocked the world by sinking , one of eight ships in six days from Convoys SC 3 and OB 213. On board the liner were 100 children, 90 of whom were being evacuated to Canada under the Children's Overseas Reception Board initiative.

The sinking ship took on an immediate list, thus causing problems launching all but two of the lifeboats. As hundreds of survivors struggled in the water, the U-boat's powerful searchlight swept once over the chaotic scene, before she left the area. The survivors in the boats were not rescued for nearly 24 hours. In that time dozens of children and adults died from exposure or drowned, leaving only 148 survivors (19 children, 20 women, and 109 men) out of 406 on board (100 children, 55 women, and 251 men). One boat was not recovered for a further eight days. In total 258 people, including 81 children, 35 women, and 142 men, died in the disaster, which effectively ended the overseas evacuation programme.

The controversy of City of Benares disaster has been debated ever since. It has been suggested that had the British openly declared that the ship was carrying evacuees, then the Germans would have taken pains not to sink it, recognising the potential for a propaganda crisis, which indeed occurred. However, the ship was not only travelling unlit at night in an Allied convoy, but it was also the flagship of Rear-Admiral Edmund Mackinnon, the convoy commander. Other historians have argued that the Germans would have attacked any large liners at the time, no matter what cargo was being carried or who was on the passenger list. However, the Benares was painted like a troop ship, and the U-boat, believing that it was only carrying soldiers and crew, sank the ship. Among the other sinkings was the British frigate .

Ninth to twelfth patrols (October 1940, February 1941, March 1941 and June 1941)
On her ninth and tenth patrols, U-48 claimed two and five victims respectively, but she was clearly becoming obsolete in the face of improving technology on both sides, despite a winter refit. Her range and torpedo capacity were too small for the widening nature of the sea war, and she would be a risk to her crew and other U-boats if she continued much longer in the main battlefield of the North Atlantic. On her final patrol she sank five more ships; the boat was boosted by the award of the Knight's Cross of the Iron Cross to Erich Zürn, the boat's executive officer, for his success and judgement during the ship's career.

Retirement and fate
U-48 returned to Kiel on 22 June 1941, where her crew disembarked and she was transferred to a training flotilla operating exclusively in the Baltic Sea. Unlike many of her contemporaries, U-48 never sailed on patrols against Soviet targets following Operation Barbarossa the following month. In 1943 she was deemed unfit even for this reduced service, being laid up at Neustadt in Holstein with only a skeleton crew performing minor maintenance. It was there that she remained for the next two years, until the maintenance crew, realising that the war was ending and the boat would be captured, scuttled her in the Bay of Lübeck on 3 May 1945, where she remains.

Wolfpacks
U-48 took part in two wolfpacks, namely:
 Rösing (12 – 15 June 1940) 
 West (2 – 8 June 1941)

Summary of raiding history

See also
 Battle of the Atlantic

References

Notes

Citations

Bibliography

External links

1939 ships
German Type VIIB submarines
Ships built in Kiel
U-boats commissioned in 1939
World War II shipwrecks in the Baltic Sea
World War II submarines of Germany
Operation Regenbogen (U-boat)
Maritime incidents in May 1945